When a descrambler is added to the Cable Converter Box in the same chassis, it is referred to as a Converter/Descrambler or sometimes a Combination Unit, and is a type of Set-top box, it allows : local broadcast channels, basic cable channels, authorized premium channels, "Pay-Per-View" (PPV), and “Video On Demand” (VOD) services to be viewed. A Combination Converter/Descrambler is generally called a Set-top box or STB it is a single (one-piece) system installed in a single cabinet and represents a single component that is capable of descrambling premium services, like HBO or Showtime, pay-per-view cable channels., Video on Demand, Games or other specialty pay services, and transposes the cable signal for RF output on channel 3 or 4. This unit contains a converter and a descrambler, enclosed in a common box and outputs the signal directly to a TV, VCR, DVR, PC, DVD or video projector.

References
United States Patent 6070001 Addressability system Patent 
United States Patent 4937865 Cable TV channel security system having remotely addressable traps 
Conditional Access System Indigital Corporation
ADDRESSABLE CABLE TV SYSTEMS Scatmag.com
the definition of Addressable Cable Systems, The ITV Dictionary 
Plug the Revenue Leaks in Your Cable System!, Scientific Atlanta
Word Descrambler, Tool
Converter Box, RCN
Troubleshooting Converter Box, RCN
 New Jersey College Converter Box Setup, TCNJ
Converter Box, Cinemasource
Digital TV Converter Box, DTVFacts
 Digital TV Converter Box, NY Times
Basic Cable-Ready TV Hookup with a Cable Converter, Time Warner Cable
Cable Converter Manufacturers, Electronickits.com
Cable Descramblers, Cable Descramblers Plan
 Cable TV Converters, O'Reilly
Digital TV Converters, Ecoustics
TV Converters Help, Expedient

See also
 Business Support Systems
 Operations Support System
 Cable television headend
 Set-top box
Cable Converter Box
 Scrambler
 Descrambler
 encryption
 Provisioning
 conditional access system
 One-time pad
 Voice inversion
 Addressable Systems
 Addressability

Related Technologies:
ATSC tuner
Audio
Cable modem
Connectivity: RS-232, USB, Bluetooth and Wi-Fi
Digital television adapter (DTA)
DOCSIS
DVB
Free-to-air
Integrated Services Digital Broadcasting
Interactive television
IPTV
QAM tuner
QPSK
Satellite dish
Symbol rate

Consumer electronics
Digital television